Fort James is a fort at the entrance to the harbour of St. John's, Antigua and Barbuda. The fort was built to guard St. John's harbour and is one of the many forts built by the British in the 18th century. Fear of a French invasion prompted the construction. It is located on a headland overlooking the town northwesterly. A powder magazine, several cannons and the foundation of the fort's wall remain. The main attraction today is the excellent view of the surrounding harbor.

The fort is named after King James II of England. Work on the fort started in 1706, and most of the buildings were built in 1739. In 1773, the fort was armed with 36 guns, and had a barracks which accommodated 75 men. In the 19th century, a gun fired salutes at visiting warships, as well as signals at sunrise and sunset.

References

Forts in Antigua and Barbuda
British forts
Buildings and structures in St. John's, Antigua and Barbuda
1700s establishments in the Caribbean
1706 establishments in North America
1706 establishments in the British Empire